San Vicente is a village on Saipan in the Northern Mariana Islands. It is located on the eastern side close to the shore of Magicienne Bay, to the south of the island's highest point, Mount Tapochau. It is connected via the cross-island road to Susupe in the west and with Capitol Hill and Tanapag to the north.

Education
Commonwealth of the Northern Mariana Islands Public School System operates local public schools. San Vicente Elementary School is located in San Vicente.

References

Towns and villages in the Northern Mariana Islands
Saipan